Hải Ninh may refer to:

Hải Ninh, Bình Thuận, a rural commune of Bắc Bình District
Hải Ninh, Nam Định, a rural commune of Hải Hậu District
Hải Ninh, Quảng Bình, a rural commune of Quảng Ninh District
Hải Ninh, Thanh Hóa, a rural commune of Tĩnh Gia District
Former Hải Ninh Province in northeastern coast of Vietnam with Móng Cái as its provincial capital, now part of Quảng Ninh Province.
Former Hải Ninh District of Quảng Ninh Province, now the city of Móng Cái.
Hải Ninh (director), Vietnamese director of films including Girl from Hanoi.